Atima is a municipality in the Honduran department of Santa Bárbara. In 2018 it had a population of 11,976. As of 2020 its mayor is Roger Gabriel Leiva Gonzales.

In 2021, two workers were stabbed fatally in the village of Berlín.

Demographics
At the time of the 2013 Honduras census, Atima municipality had a population of 17,648. Of these, 88.62% were Mestizo, 7.13% Indigenous (6.96% Lenca), 3.54% White and 0.71% Black or Afro-Honduran.

References 

Municipalities of the Santa Bárbara Department, Honduras